Darlington Township may refer to one of the following places in the State of South Dakota:

Darlington Township, Charles Mix County, South Dakota
Darlington Township, Clark County, South Dakota

See also

Darlington Township (disambiguation)

South Dakota township disambiguation pages